Simone Bolelli and Máximo González were the defending champions but chose not to defend their title.

Luciano Darderi and Fernando Romboli won the title after defeating Denys Molchanov and Igor Zelenay 6–2, 6–3 in the final.

Seeds

Draw

References

External links
 Main draw

Emilia-Romagna Open - Doubles
2022 Doubles